The Gothenburg congestion tax, also referred to as the Gothenburg congestion charge, is a congestion pricing system implemented as a tax levied on most vehicles entering and exiting central Gothenburg, Sweden, including some main roads passing by the city. The congestion tax was introduced on January 1, 2013, with the Stockholm congestion tax as a model.

The primary purpose of the congestion tax is to reduce traffic congestion and improve the environmental situation in central Gothenburg, and to get financing for large road and rail construction projects in and around Gothenburg. The largest such project is Västlänken.

Affected area
The congestion tax area encompasses essentially the entire Gothenburg City Centre and the E6 main road passing the city. Curiously, cars passing the city are also taxed, providing no incentive to drive around the city rather than through the city, contrary to most other congestion charge schemes in the world. As an example in Stockholm, only vehicles entering and exiting the central city are taxed, not those passing by the city on the main highway. In Stockholm, there is no need to tax people driving creative detours.

There are unmanned electronic control points (in Swedish: , literally payment station) at all entrances to this area. The congestion tax is applied when passing stations in both directions. There is also a control point on the west of the city on Älvsborgsbron, far from the main congestion charge zone, which is perhaps odd since neither side of the bridge is within a charging zone. The effect of placing a control point here effectively means that any vehicle wishing to drive along the west coast of Sweden past Gothenburg must pay the congestion charge, with the shortest detour to avoid the charge adding 45 km to a journey, via Partille.

Amount of tax to pay

The amount of tax payable depends on what time of the day a motorist enters or exits the congestion tax area. There is no charge on Saturdays, Sundays, public holidays or the day before public holidays, nor during nights (18:30 – 05:59), nor during the month of July.

The maximum amount of tax per vehicle per day is 60 SEK (6.40 Euro, 7.70  USD). 22 SEK is around 2.35 Euro or 2.80 USD.

If a vehicle passes two stations within one hour, only the higher tax is paid.

Some vehicles are exempt from tax, although notably environmentally friendly vehicles (mainly electric or natural gas or ethanol fuelled) must still pay.

Foreign registered vehicles were exempt until 2014 mainly for practical reasons, hard to get access to foreign car registers, and to claim payment from foreigners. But they are included now because of objections from companies about unfair taxation, and because the "Eurovignette" EU directive (1999/62/EC article 7 and 2006/38/EC) requires that user charges may not discriminate on the grounds of the nationality of the haulier or the origin of the vehicle. The authority has contracted a collection agency, ParkTrade, which in turn has contracted collection agencies in the most common countries that charge the owners, using the brand name EPASS24.

See also
 Gothenburg quadricentennial jubilee
 Road pricing
 Congestion pricing
 Electronic toll collection
 Stockholm congestion tax

References

External links
 Swedish Road Administration Congestion taxes in Stockholm and Gothenburg
 Law on congestion tax Lag (2004:629) om trängselskatt (Swedish)

Local taxation
Transport in Gothenburg
Electronic toll collection
Urban planning in Sweden
Road congestion charge schemes
Vehicle taxes
Taxation in Sweden
2013 establishments in Sweden
Driving in Sweden